Autumn Shower is a South Korean television drama broadcast from September to November 2005 on MBC.

Plot
Choi Yoon-jae (Oh Ji-ho) ends up in a car accident causing the passenger, his wife Kyu-eun (Kim So-yeon), to go into a coma. Park Yeon-seo (Jung Ryeo-won), Kyu-eun's best friend, is secretly in love with Yoon-jae. While Kyu-eun is in a coma, Yoon-jae and Yeon-seo begin an affair.

Cast
 Oh Ji-ho as Choi Yoon-jae
 Kim So-yeon as Lee Kyu-eun
 Jung Ryeo-won as Park Yeon-seo
 Lee Chun-hee as Kim Soo-hyung
 Oh Se-jung as a girl who likes Soo-hyung
 Park Dong-choon as Yeon-seo's father
 Han Jung-hee as Yeon-seo's mother
 Kim Hye-ok as Nam Kyung-mi (Yeon-seo's step mother, 48)
 Han Jin-hee as Choi Suk-won (Yoon-jae's father, 58-61)
 Kim Young-ran as Kang Hyung-sook (Yoon-jae's mother, 58-61)
 Hwang Woo-jin as Hwang Park-soo

References

External links
 Official website
 

MBC TV television dramas
2005 South Korean television series debuts
2005 South Korean television series endings
Korean-language television shows
South Korean romance television series
South Korean melodrama television series